Warut Supphaso (born January 2, 1986) is a Thai professional footballer who plays as a midfielder for Thai League 3 club Pattaya Dolphins United .

Club career

External links
 
 Profile at Goal

Living people
1986 births
Warut Supphaso
Warut Supphaso
Association football midfielders
Warut Supphaso
Warut Supphaso
Warut Supphaso
Warut Supphaso
Warut Supphaso
Warut Supphaso
Warut Supphaso
Warut Supphaso
Warut Supphaso